Annette Verschuren,  is a Canadian business woman. She is currently the Chair & Chief Executive Officer of NRStor Inc., The company develops and manages energy storage projects. 

Prior to this, Ms. Verschuren was the President of The Home Depot Canada, overseeing the growth of the company's Canadian operations from 19 to 179 stores between 1996 and 2011, increasing revenue from $600 million to $6 billion.

After Home Depot, she took a year off and went around the world. In her travels, she saw energy as a global issue, with enormous business potential, and many benefits to developing economies. Back in Canada, Ms. Verschuren founded NRStor in 2012 with an investment from Northwater Capital.

Career 
Verschuren began her career as a development officer with the Cape Breton Development Corporation, a coal mining operation, in Sydney, Nova Scotia.  She then worked with Canada Development Investment Corporation as executive vice-president, to help privatize crown corporations. Her next stop was as a Vice President of Corporate Development at Imasco Ltd., one of Canada’s largest holding companies.  Ms. Verschuren then launched Michaels of Canada, a chain of arts and crafts stores before landing at the helm of Home Depot Canada.

Ms. Verschuren has been appointed to numerous government advisory roles. Among them: Economic Advisory Council, during the economic crisis in 2008, the Canada-U.S. Council for Advancement of Women Entrepreneurs and Business Leaders and the Advisory Council for NAFTA. Recently, Ms Verschuren participated in our Government’s Roundtable on Decarbonization.

Verschuren is a board member of Liberty Mutual, Air Canada, Saputo Inc. and Canadian Natural Resources Limited (CNRL). In addition, Ms. Verschuren is the Chair of both the MaRS Discovery District Board and the Sustainable Development Technology Canada (SDTC) on behalf of the Federal Government. Ms. Verschuren is also President of the Ontario Energy Association.

Corporate social responsibility 
In 2011, Verschuren was honoured as an Officer of The Order of Canada for her contribution to the retail industry and corporate social responsibility. In 2010, she was appointed co-chair of the 2012 Governor General's Leadership Conference, Canada's premier leadership training event. Annette Verschuren was honoured by the Canadian Business Hall of Fame in 2019.

A champion of community investment and volunteerism, Verschuren is the Chancellor of Cape Breton University and is on the Board of the Verschuren Centre for Sustainability in Energy and the Environment, (VCSEE). (VCSEE).

She supports many causes but focuses on mental health, education and indigenous programmes. She is a founding member of the Rideau Hall Foundation. She co-chairs the Smart Prosperity Initiative, which is mapping out a course to a stronger, cleaner economy for Canada.

Author 
Verschuren recently wrote a business book "Bet On Me", leading and succeeding in business and in life, published by Harper Collins. The book was a Finalist for the National Business Book Award in 2017.

Education 
Annette Verschuren has received fourteen Honourary Doctorates from Canadian universities including her alma mater, St. Francis Xavier University.

Personal life 
Annette Verschuren and her husband, Stan Shibinsky, often return to her home province of Nova Scotia and her family home.

References

Living people
Canadian women chief executives
Canadian university and college chancellors
Officers of the Order of Canada
St. Francis Xavier University alumni
People from North Sydney, Nova Scotia
Canadian women academics
Women academic administrators
Canadian academic administrators
Year of birth missing (living people)